Suns of Arqa are a world music collective founded in 1979 by Michael Wadada.  Since the group's formation, over 200 people from around the world have played and recorded with them, and in many cases these were like-minded musicians Wadada met as he travelled the world. Pioneers of World Beat, Ambient, Downtempo and Electro-Dub, Suns of Arqa draw inspiration from around the world, interpreting indigenous, tribal and classical folk traditions.  They have created an impressive legacy and earned worldwide recognition.

Early days
Suns of Arqa started out in the World Music scene in 1979, recording their debut album Revenge of the Mozabites which was produced by Adrian Sherwood, who later became known for On-U Sound Records.  In 1982, they were invited to play at the first WOMAD Festival by Peter Gabriel.  They performed with Prince Far-I at Band on the Wall, his last concert before his death in 1983. Since then, they have gone on to work with a variety of musicians and performers, such as John Cooper Clarke, Professor Stanley Unwin, flautist Tim Wheater, Adrian Sherwood, singer Helen Watson and a great many others.

The 1990s and beyond
In the early 1990s, Wadada started his own Arka Sound label, and started re-issuing the group's older vinyl albums on new compilation CDs. One of these, Land of a Thousand Churches, was a compilation featuring collaborations with artists such as James Young, Helen Watson and Feso Trombone.  His combination of Hindu and Celtic traditions at a musical level became a trademark that ultimately became identifiable as his musical style.  A few years later, Suns of Arqa worked with artists such as 808 State, A Guy Called Gerald, John Leckie, Zion Train, Muslimgauze, Youth and Astralasia.  The results were a fusion of dub, drum and bass, and the existing styles which Suns of Arqa were associated with.

Live
Throughout their career Suns of Arqa have played at various major music festivals, including the Glastonbury Festival, Phoenix Festival and the first WOMAD Festival. By the mid 1990s, the Suns of Arqa live setup added Scottish bagpipes, Indian strings, reggae percussion, and a variety of other instruments and sounds. They have released three live albums to date, Musical Revue (later reissued as Live with Prince Far I), Animan, and Big and Live.

Media
NME have described Suns of Arqa albums as "definitely the most unusual records of all time", and added that "Some might call it 'genius'; most will just settle for the word 'insane'. Either way, the result is fascinating", while East West Journal (USA) have said "I'm not at all certain how this band manages to so cohesively merge rhythms no other group in the world has dared to mix, I only know that their music is reverent, humorous, profound, disorientating, terrifying and fantastic all at the same time.".  Rick Anderson of AllMusic wrote that "Many bands claim to deal in global fusion music, but few have as firm a claim on the genre as the Suns of Arqa ... Big & Live documents several recent live performances and shows Wadada and his cohorts in top form, delivering everything from Celtic-reggae fusion 'Om Kaaraaya' ... to Asian meditational sounds ... and sounds in between, such as 'Majhi Ra', which adds the keening tones of the shenai to the Celtic-reggae mix. There are fine vocal performances by Angel Eye, Reba Bhaduri and Cat Von Trapp ... some listeners will find this music immediately delightful, while other will probably be mostly puzzled."

Suns of Arqa musicians and collaborators

Michael Wadada (founder, creator of Suns of Arqa since 1979)
Angel Eye (since 1989)
Sanyogita Kumari (since 1987)
Johar Ali Khan (since 1992)
Kadir Durvesh (1987–2000)
Gagarin (since 1987)
John Snelson (1992–1999)
Marek Miczyk (1982–1999)
John Perkins (1987–1994)
Prince Far I (1982–1983)
Marcel King (1987)
Graham Massey (1987–1990)
Raghunath Seth (1992–2010)
Youth (since 1992)
A Guy Called Gerald (1994)
John Leckie (since 1999)
Alex Paterson (since 2000)
Greg Hunter (since 1992)
John Cooper Clarke (1987–2004)
Roland Beelen (since 1983)
Adrian Sherwood (1979–1980)
Style Scott (1980)
Chris Joyce (1982–1992)
Prince Hammer (1982–1987)
Keshav Sathe (1982–1987)
Helen Watson (1982–1987)
Kenny Margolis (1983–1985)
Professor Stanley Unwin (1985–1987)
Steve Hopkins (1987)
James Young (1987)
Roly Wynne (1994–1995)
Bryn Jones (1996)
Damon Reece (2003)
Philippe Falliex (2007)
Skip McDonald (2011)
Delroy 'Sticksman' Walker (since 1992)
Shaun Davis (since 2001)
Brian Hyphen (since 2015)
DJ Guapo (2005–2009)
Kuba (since 2017)
Tim Wheater (since 1989)
Wayne Worm (1982–1994)
Eric Random (1984–1988)
Ian Green (1979-1980)
Moot Beret (1980–1987)
Mark Stone (1980)
Tony Sullivan (1980)
Anton Behrendt (1982)
Big Red (1982–1983)
Chris Gill (1982)
Marie Louise Jackson (1982)
Brian Jones (1982)
Mustaphafakir (1982–1983)
Danny Sheals (1982–1987)
John 'JJ' Slater (1982-1983)
Snuff (1982)
Spliff (1982–1983)
Tony Trundel (1982)
Aziz Zeria (1982–1985)
Kalu Zeria (1982–1995)
Papu Zeria (1982–1983)
Steve Cyclepath (1983)
The Legendary Leperds (1983)
Keith 'Lizard' Logan (1983–1987)
John Scott (1983–1985)
Amar Singh (1983)
Doctor Himadri Chaudhuri (1984–1985)
Doreen Edwards (1984–1985)
Madastra (1984)
Vocal Harders (1985)
Martin Harrison (1985)
Stalwart (1985–1987)
Feso Trombone (1985)
Kwasi Asante (1987–1994)
Daniel Broad (1987)
Kendal Ernest (1987)
Khalid (1987)
Paula McKennol (1987)
Denyse MacNamara (1987)
Phil Mullen (1987)
Cliff Stapleton (1987)
Sarah Wildwitch (1987)
Colin Wood (1987)
Country Culture (1988)
Country Rankin (1988–1996)
Clare 'Ireti' Durrant (1989–1996)
Nicolas Magriel (since 1989)
Hassan Makki (1989)
Sandeep Popatkar (1989–1994)
Phil Kirby (1991–1992)
Reba Bhaduri (1992–1995)
Sumit Bhaduri (1992)
Sam McGrady (1992)
Dhevdhas Nair (1992–1994)
Wizard (1993–1996)
Quentin Budworth (1994-1996)
Garbi Armii (1995–2003)
Alex Fiennes (1995–1996)
Srirangam S Kannan (1995)
Rick 'The Switch' Turner (1995)
Alan DeCampos (1996–1997)
Lamin Jassey (1996)
Allan Martin (1996)
Abu Mustafa (1996)
Thierry 'Lion Man' Negro (1996)
Eric Trochu (1996)
Cod (1999)
Arif Durvesh (1999)
Gayan Uttejak Orchestra (1999–2003)
Laszlo Hortobagyi (1999–2001)
Shahbaz Hussain (1999–2002)
RJ Simms (1999)
Becky Spellar (1999)
Cat Von Trapp (1999)
Clive Wills (1999–2013)
Lyne Okey (2001)
Geshela Ngaqang Sherap (2001)
Agnieszka Jablonska (2003)
Kasha (2003)
Khaya (2003)
Joe McGill (2003)
Gita Sparkle (2005)
Michael Ormiston (2009)
Candida Valentino (2009)
David Hendry (2011)
Maren Lueg (2011)
Chas Whitaker (2011)
Steve York (2011)
Alan McLeod (2018–2019)

Discography

Albums

Remix albums

Re-issues

Singles

Compilations

Videos

References

British ambient music groups
British world music groups
Dub musical groups
Electronica music groups
Musical groups established in 1979